Siwe-Palar-Khuppak was the Sukkalmah (ruler) of Elam from around 1778 to 1745 B.C.E.

Around 1767 B.C.E, Siwe-Palar-Khuppak formed a coalition with Zimri-Lim of Mari and Hammurabi of Babylon. He led this coalition against Eshnunna, conquering it and imposed direct rule from his sukkal Kudu-zulush in Susa. This coalition turned against him as he attempted to expand his power into Babylon. Hammurabi, allied with Zimri-Lim, expelled the Elamite's forces from Eshnunna One of his generals was Kunnam of Elam who appears in many letters found at Mari.

In a clay tablet, Siwe-Palar-Khuppak refers to himself as "Governor of Elam" and "Enlarger of the Empire". It is speculated that the tablet was made after Siwe-Palar-Khuppak's defeat by Hammurabi's coalition, and that the title "Enlarger of the Empire" refers to conquests made to west in modern Iran to offset his defeat. This hypothesis is supported by the fact that a twelfth-century document lists Siwe-Palar-Khuppak as one of Elam's great men.

References 

Elamite kings
Sukkalmah Dynasty